Daniel Silva (born 19 June 1966) is a Portuguese professional golfer.

Silva was born in Johannesburg, South Africa. He turned professional in 1988 and spent the next decade attempting to hold down a place on the European Tour. He was a regular visitor to qualifying school, where he came out with the number one card in 1990. He followed up that success with two solid seasons back to back in 1991 and 1992, which were the only years that he made the top one hundred on the Order of Merit, before being setback by injury. His sole European Tour win came at the 1992 Jersey European Airways Open. It was the first tour win by a Portuguese golfer. He represented Portugal in the World Cup in 1989 and 1991. Silva is a renowned golf coach who has trained with Butch Harmon, the former coach of Tiger Woods, and has watched many world-famous golfers play and train. In 2015, Silva founded Season Golf Academy (SGA) in Finland.

Professional wins (1)

European Tour wins (1)

Results in major championships

Note: Silva only played in The Open Championship.
"T" = tied

Team appearances
Amateur
St Andrews Trophy (representing the Continent of Europe): 1986, 1988

Professional
World Cup (representing Portugal): 1989, 1991

References

External links

Portuguese male golfers
European Tour golfers
Golfers from Johannesburg
Sportspeople from Faro District
People from Loulé
South African people of Portuguese descent
1966 births
Living people